218th may refer to:

218th (Edmonton) Battalion, CEF, was a unit in the Canadian Expeditionary Force during the First World War
218th Infantry Division (Germany), a large military unit that served in World War II
218th Maneuver Enhancement Brigade (United States), a maneuver enhancement brigade of the United States Army National Guard of South Carolina

See also
218 (number)
218, the year 73 (LXXIII) of the Julian calendar
218 BC